Dance Central is a music rhythm game for the Xbox 360 Kinect that was released in November 2010 in most areas and in June 2011 in Japan. It is the first installment in the Dance Central series.

Gameplay
Dance Central is a rhythm game where players follow characters' movements in various arenas and earn stars while doing so. On the right side of the characters are flashcards for guidance, displaying the current move that is being done. The judgement of each move done is divided into four critiques: X, Almost, Nice and Flawless. If a player earns a consecutive amount of Flawlesses, the arena will turn into a peak mode glowing with lights, and it can be maintained with Flawlesses or Nice critiques. If a player earns a consecutive amount of Xs however, the arena loses vividness and the music gets muffled. This can be changed back to its regular state if a player get a Nice or a Flawless once in its dull state. A total of 5 stars can be earned per routine, but if a player does it very well, they can earn Gold Stars. Earning stars unlocks content for the game.

Along with stars, there is a score, which are both displayed by a boombox named Boomy. Boomy also features a little number on it, indicating a score multiplier. Doing moves in succession increases the multiplier, earning more points, but missing a move cause the multiplier to drop from its starting point.

Songs are divided into categories, and each song has three difficulty levels: Easy, Medium, and Hard. Only Easy is unlocked in the beginning, and the player earns the other difficulties as they move on. Only they do well, they can also unlock a "No Flashcards" mode that does not display the flashcards on screen.

Each song features a Freestyle section that allows players to dance however they desire. When so, a camera takes photos as they are freestyling, and distributes them out before the routine revises, however these have to be earned by obtaining camera icons that appear next to some of the moves. Doing those in succession results in a photo opportunity in Freestyle. These photos can be viewed after the song, but they cannot be saved. The option for photo taking can also be disabled.

There are five modes available in Dance Central:
 Perform It!: A standard mode where a player can dance to routines in the game.
 Fitness: A mode that tracks calories burning while playing. It features an indicator for calories and a timer for how long the session has been going when on.
 Dance Battle: A competitive mode where two players go head-to-head for glory. One player goes at a time and the one with the highest score wins.
 Challenge: After getting 4 stars on each song in a category, a challenge is unlocked. The challenge is a mix of all of the songs in that category as one. A Grand Finale Challenge is also available, but the player has to get 4 stars in each challenge in order to unlock that one.
 Break It Down: A training mode where the player can learn the moves or assist in moves they are having difficulties with. The mode cuts the routines into sections and goes through each step individually. When the player passes all the moves in the section, a recap is performed, and the process repeats until the end. There is also an option to slow down the moves, giving more analyzation if need be.
There is also a place where players can look at statistics. They range from the amount of time spent of the game to number of calories burned, and each statistic features a title that changes depending on the amount spent on the statistic, although they are there just for show. An Options section is also present, allowing the player to adjust settings if need be.

Characters
Dance Central features ten different characters. Eight of them are unlocked from the start while two are unlocked through certain achievements. Each character, with the exception of one, has a main outfit and an alternate outfit, and the alternate outfit can be unlocked by earning 25 stars with that dancer, aside from ELIOT's whose alternate outfit is unlocked by reaching the Living Legend rank.

Angel - A Latin lover that grabs the ladies' attention (Main Outfit : Chill) (Alternate Outfit : Show-Off) - voiced by choreographer Marcos Aguirre.

"Miss" Aubrey - A very confident and snooty queen bee (Main Outfit : School Daze) (Alternate Outfit : Princess)

Emilia - An athletic girl that works out at the gym constantly (Main Outfit : Sweatin') (Alternate Outfit : Knockout)

Dare - A British, pink-haired clubber that enjoys partying (Main Outfit : Neon Dreams) (Alternate Outfit : DIY Couture)

MacCoy - A guy with old school flair and technological gear (Main Outfit : Sunday Best) (Alternate Outfit : Stylehead)

Mo - A friendly guy that jokes around from time to time (Main Outfit : B-Boy) (Alternate Outfit : Flash)

Oblio - A mysterious guy with words of wisdom (Main Outfit : Dystopia) (Alternate Outfit : Gearhead)

Taye - A girl with tons of attitude and sass (Main Outfit : Street Chic) (Alternate Outfit : Summertime)

ELIOT - A robot that represses his robot roots and swears he is human (Main Outfit : 2.0) (Alternate Outfit : Dressy)

Shinju (originally known as Ttiw Tolrep, named after two of the game's designers) - A silent ninja that wears pink and carries nunchucks

ELIOT can be attained after reaching the "Living Legend" rank or by earning 4 stars on the Grand Finale Challenge on any difficulty. Doing it by the former unlocks him with both outfits available while doing it by the latter only unlocks him with his main outfit available.

Shinju can be attained after entering "Left, Up, X, Up, Right, Y" at the title screen using the Xbox 360 Controller.

Venues
The game features six venues for the player to dance in. Two are available from the start while the rest have to be unlocked in order to play in them. Venues can be changed before the player starts a routine, aside from the Grand Finale Challenge where it is initially defaulted with Dr. Tan's Estate, but can eventually be changed once the player passes the challenge.

5th Period - A school cafeteria (Available From Start)

The Planks - A pier (Available From Start)

The Roost - A rooftop (Earn 25 Stars)

Gridlock - A bridge (Earn 50 Stars)

City Limits - A power plant (Earn 100 Stars)

Dr. Tan's Estate - A club owned by Dr. Tan (Earn 4 Stars in the Grand Finale Challenge in any difficulty)

Ranks
The game features a ranking system that gives the player a title. They are merely there just for display, but they do start from the bottom and go up as the player earns stars. There are 20 ranks in the game.

Story
While there is no Story mode in the game, there are two cutscenes that exist within the game implying a story.

A club is being promoted by Mo, spreading all over the area and getting multiple characters' attention. As such, they attend to go to the club to party. When done promoting, Mo goes to a phone booth, picks up the phone, and hears a representation for the club on the other line. After putting it back, the platform underneath him lowers down, taking him to the club. The club ends up being revealed as Dr. Tan's Estate, and while most of the characters who attended are having fun, Oblio is sitting against a wall in dismay. He eventually leaves the club and rides away on his motorcycle, but as he is doing so, the player sees the scene being rewound. It then shows the scene on one of many screens that are being monitored by Dr. Tan. Intrigued by what he is seeing, he closes the rest of the screens, smirks, and laughs hysterically.

Songs

The game features 32 songs for the player to dance to. Each song is ranked under a certain category: Warm Up, Simple, Moderate, Tough, Legit, Hardcore, and Off The Hook. Each song also has a default dancer associated with it, although they can be changed beforehand. There are three difficulties available for each song: Easy, Medium, and Hard, but only Easy is available from the beginning. Medium is unlocked once the player either earns at least 3 stars on Easy or passes 50% of the routine in Break It Down on Medium or Hard, and Hard is unlocked once the player either earns at least 3 stars on Medium or passes 50% of the routine in Break It Down on Hard.

Each song has a No Flashcards mode available in which the flashcards do not pop up on the screen, but it has to be unlocked in order to enable it. The mode is unlocked in separate stages for each song, specifically when the player earns at least 5 stars under each difficulty (i.e. earning at least 5 stars on Easy in a song will unlock the mode undemode Easy for that song).

Challenges

Challenges are a combination of songs mashed together as one. They are unlocked once the player earns at least 4 stars on each song used in the challenge, aside from the Grand Finale Challenge where it is the same premise, but with challenges. The player can bypass unlocking the difficulties one by one for the Challenges by earning the minimum amount of stars needed for each song at the same difficulty rather than earning at least 3 stars on the previous difficulty once the challenge is available.

The first seven challenges contain each song from the difficulty, while the Grand Finale Challenge contains one song from each difficulty. The Grand Finale Challenge initially does not allow the player to change the default dancer, and it is done with ELIOT the first time through, but once they clear it, they can change it. Additionally, ELIOT, Dr. Tan's Estate, and a gold version of Boomy are unlocked through the Grand Finale Challenge once cleared.

No Flashcards mode is also available as an unlockable, and the same rules apply when unlocking them. Unlike the songs, there is no Break It Down mode available from the Challenges.

Downloadable content

Dance Central has additional content they can purchase for the game. Like the on-disc songs, they follow the same format in playing them.

Free with Best Buy code.

No longer available for purchase.

Legacy
In the Arcade from the Asian Attractions in the Expo 2011, the Dance Central arcade is named "Dance Hero".

Reception

Critical reception
Dance Central received positive reviews from critics. It received a score of 83.22% on GameRankings and 82/100 on Metacritic. It received a rating of 8/10 from IGN and a rating of 8.5/10 from GameSpot.  Video game talk show Good Game: Spawn Point gave the game an 8 out of 10 calling it the best launch game for the Kinect and a step forward for dance games. They said workout mode was a nice addition which will definitely give you a workout and the Dance Battles would be a big hit at parties.
Nintendo of America President Reggie Fils-Aime was impressed, and said in an interview that "Dance Central is, by far, the best Kinect game".

Sales
The game sold 2.5 million copies.

References

2010 video games
Dance video games
Kinect games
Music video games
Video games developed in the United States
Xbox 360 games
Xbox 360-only games
Harmonix games